Amorphophallus bufo is a species of flowering plant in the arum family Araceae, native to Peninsular Malaysia. Its petioles have numerous black spots; it is thought this is defensive mimicry, with the spots appearing to herbivores to be a swarm of ants guarding the plant.

References

bufo
Endemic flora of Malaysia
Flora of Peninsular Malaysia
Plants described in 1909